The 2003 Arizona Wildcats baseball team represented the University of Arizona during the 2003 NCAA Division I baseball season. The Wildcats played their home games at Frank Sancet Stadium. The team was coached by Andy Lopez in his 2nd season at Arizona. The Wildcats finished with a record of 35-23 (13-11 Conf.) and were selected to the NCAA Tournament for the 1st time under Andy Lopez and 1st time since 1999, losing in the Fullerton Regional to the San Diego Toreros.

Previous season 
The Wildcats finished the 2002 season with a record of 31-24 (9-15 Conf.). Arizona missed the postseason for a 3rd straight year and 8th time in the previous decade.

Personnel

Roster

Coaches

Opening day

Schedule and results

Fullerton Regional

2003 MLB Draft

References 

Arizona
Arizona Wildcats baseball seasons
Arizona baseball